Wide Field Survey Telescope (WFST) is a Chinese telescope characterized by a 2.5-meter primary mirror.
The telescope project was launched in 2017 by several research institutions including the University of Science and Technology of China and the Purple Mountain Observatory of the Chinese Academy of Sciences.
The telescope is to operate at six wavelength bands spanning from 320 to 1028 nm.
The building of the telescope is scheduled to begin work in 2022.

Notes 

Chinese telescopes